Stylenanda() is a South Korea-based make-up and fashion brand that is owned by L'Oréal.

Stylenanda was founded in 2004 by Nanda, owned by Kim So Hee. It had further expanded internationally and established branches in Hong Kong, China, Singapore, Japan and Thailand.

May 2, 2018 L'Oréal announced the acquisition of 100% of Nanda Co. Ltd. One of its flagship stores is located in Myeong-dong, Seoul in South Korea. Named Pink Hotel, it is a hotel-themed “everything pink” flagship store.

References

External links
 
https://wwd.com/beauty-industry-news/beauty-features/how-koreas-stylenanda-became-a-fashion-force-1202664216/

South Korean companies established in 2004
Chemical companies established in 2004
Clothing companies established in 2004
Clothing brands of South Korea